Candillargues is a commune in the Hérault department in southern France.

Population

History
During French revolution, Candillargues took the name Côme-de-la-Palus.

See also
Communes of the Hérault department

References

Communes of Hérault